Sergio Luini (born 12 November 1972) is an Italian gymnast. He competed at the 1996 Summer Olympics.

References

External links
 

1972 births
Living people
Italian male artistic gymnasts
Olympic gymnasts of Italy
Gymnasts at the 1996 Summer Olympics
People from Busto Arsizio
Sportspeople from the Province of Varese